Stephen Michael Ross (born May 10, 1940) is an American real estate developer, philanthropist, and sports team owner. Ross is the chairman and majority owner of The Related Companies, a global real estate development firm he founded in 1972. Related is best known for developing the Deutsche Bank Center, where Ross lives and works, as well as the Hudson Yards Redevelopment Project. According to Forbes magazine, Ross has a net worth of $7.6 billion in 2020, ranking him 185 on Forbes Billionaires List in 2020. Having doubled his net worth since 2008, he paid no income taxes in the next decade utilizing the losses on the properties he owned. Ross is also the principal owner of the Miami Dolphins and Hard Rock Stadium.

Ross is a major benefactor of his alma mater, the University of Michigan; with lifetime contributions of $478 million to the university, he is the largest donor in the university's history. According to the Chronicle of Philanthropy, his higher education gifts rank behind only those of fellow American billionaire New York City mayor Michael Bloomberg. The University of Michigan renamed its business school to the Ross School of Business in Ross's honor, in 2004, after he made a $100 million gift to fund a new business-school building. The Stephen M. Ross Academic Center was completed in winter 2006. In September 2013, Ross donated $200 million to the university ($100 million to the business school and $100 million to Michigan athletics), the largest single gift in the history of the university; the University of Michigan announced plans to rename the university's athletics campus in his honor. In 2020, Ross announced an additional $100 million donation to kickstart fundraising for the construction of the University of Michigan Detroit Center for Innovation.

Early life and education
Born and raised in Detroit, Stephen Michael Ross grew up in a Jewish family. He first attended Mumford High School in Detroit and later graduated from Miami Beach Senior High School. He attended the University of Florida for two years before transferring to the University of Michigan, where he earned a Bachelor of Business Administration degree in 1962. He later received a Juris Doctor from Wayne State University in 1965 and a Master of Laws in Taxation from the New York University School of Law in 1966. These later degrees were financed by a loan from his uncle, the businessman Max Fisher, who Ross has called, "the most important role model and inspiration for me in life.".

Career
Ross began his career as a tax attorney at Coopers & Lybrand in Detroit. In 1968, he moved to New York City and accepted a position as an assistant vice president in the real estate subsidiary of Laird Inc., then worked in the corporate finance department of Bear Stearns. In 1972, he was fired from that company after clashing with a superior; living off $10,000 ($67,000 in 2021 dollars) lent to him by his mother, he utilized his federal tax law knowledge to organize deals for wealthy investors, allowing them to shelter income with the generous incentives granted by the federal government to promote the construction of federally subsidized affordable housing.

Ross was very successful, earning $150,000 in his first year, and he was soon arranging more complicated transactions.

The Related Companies

In 1972, Ross founded The Related Companies, a real estate development company. Headquartered in New York City, Related has offices and real estate developments in Boston, Chicago, Los Angeles, Las Vegas, San Francisco, South Florida, Abu Dhabi, and Shanghai. The company directly employs approximately 2,000 people.  The company's existing portfolio of real estate assets, valued at over $15 billion, is made up of mixed-use, residential, retail, office, trade show and affordable properties in what the company calls "premier high-barrier-to-entry markets."

Related is the largest owner of luxury residential rental properties in New York with over 5,000 units in its portfolio and has developed mixed-use projects such as Deutsche Bank Center in New York and CityPlace in West Palm Beach and is currently developing the 26-acre Hudson Yards project on Manhattan's west side. Related also manages approximately $1.5 billion of equity capital on behalf of sovereign wealth funds, public pension plans, multi-managers, endowments, Taft-Hartley plans and family offices.

Related also owns Equinox Fitness Clubs, SoulCycle and fast casual restaurant chains.

Miami Dolphins
In February 2008, Ross bought 50 percent of the Miami Dolphins franchise, Dolphin Stadium (now known as Hard Rock Stadium), and surrounding land, from then-owner Wayne Huizenga for $550 million, with an agreement to later become the Dolphins' managing general partner. On January 20, 2009, Ross closed on the purchase of an additional 45% of the team from Huizenga. The total value of the deal was $1.1 billion. This means Ross is now the owner of 95% of both the franchise and the stadium. Ross announced his intention to keep Bill Parcells as the director of football operations.

Since buying the Dolphins, Ross has brought in Gloria Estefan, Marc Anthony, Venus Williams, Tony Chesta and Serena Williams, as minority owners of the team.  In 2013, Ross made a push to obtain multimillion-dollar public funding from the state of Florida and Miami-Dade taxpayers to help renovate Hard Rock Stadium, the Dolphins' home field. After this effort failed in the Florida legislature, a team spokesman said that Ross did not intend to move the team but that under an eventual future owner the Dolphins' future in the Miami area is bleak. Although Ross said he intended to keep the Dolphins "in town", there was speculation in 2013 that the team might seek to move out of Miami to a nearby locale such as Palm Beach.

On March 27, 2017, Ross cast the only "no" vote in the NFL owners' 31–1 "yes" decision on the Oakland Raiders request for approval to move to Las Vegas starting in the 2020 season. Ross said he had no personal problems with Raiders owner Mark Davis and wished the franchise well, but did not think the Raiders did everything they could to stay in Oakland, and also that having 3 teams move within only 15 months (the Rams and Chargers both moved to Los Angeles) was not good for players or fans. Ross also stated prior to his Dolphins playing the Chargers in their first home game since the move to Los Angeles that he did not believe that Chargers owner Dean Spanos made his best effort to stay in San Diego, making him a popular figure with the upset San Diego fan base.

On February 1, 2022, Ross and the Dolphins, among other teams, were cited in a federal class-action lawsuit brought forth by his former head coach Brian Flores, alleging that Ross offered Flores a $100,000 bonus for every game he lost in the Dolphins’ 2019 campaign. The suit also alleges that Ross set up Flores to meet (against league rules) with a “prominent quarterback” on another team, who was not named in the suit. As of February 2, 2022, The NFL publicly denied all allegations against Ross and all others listed in the lawsuit, releasing in an official statement "We will defend against these claims, which are without merit."

On August 2, 2022, it was announced that following a six-month independent investigation by Mary Jo White and a team of lawyers, the NFL would strip the Dolphins of their 2023 first-round draft pick and a 2024 third-round draft pick for violating the league's anti-tampering policy on three occasions from 2019 to 2022 by engaging in impermissible conversations with quarterback Tom Brady and then-New Orleans Saints coach Sean Payton, both of whom were under contract with other teams. Ross, the team owner, was also fined $1.5 million and suspended through October 17, and was prohibited from being at the Dolphins' facility or representing the team at any event until then. He was also prohibited from attending any league meeting before the annual meeting in 2023, and was removed from all league committees indefinitely. Vice chairman/limited partner Bruce Beal was fined $500,000 and will not be permitted to attend any league meetings for the rest of the 2022 season. The investigation did not find that the Dolphins intentionally lost games during the 2019 season, however.

RSE Ventures
RSE Ventures is a private investment firm that focuses on sports and entertainment, media and marketing, food and lifestyle, and technology. RSE Ventures was co-founded in 2012 by Ross and Matt Higgins, former executive vice president of the New York Jets and current vice chairman of the Miami Dolphins. RSE builds, owns and operates a variety of companies, including the Drone Racing League, Thuzio, VaynerMedia, and Relevent.

Kangaroo Media/FanVision 
Ross and Carl Peterson own Kangaroo Media, producer of FanVision.

Civic and philanthropic activities
Ross was co-chair of the University of Michigan's fundraising campaign, which was completed May 2007.

In 2004, Ross made the single largest contribution (at the time) to the University of Michigan by donating $100 million to the school. The university renamed its business school, Ross School of Business in his honor. On September 12, 2013, it was announced Ross had committed an additional $200 million gift to the university, to be distributed equally among the Ross School of Business and the university's athletic department. It replaced Charlie Munger's 2013 contribution of $115 million as the largest single gift in the university's history. On September 20, 2017, Ross donated an additional $50 million to the University of Michigan, the majority of which would support career development programs for students, innovative action-based learning experiences, and resources for attracting and developing junior faculty.

Ross was on the executive committee of NYC2012, New York's initiative to bring the summer Olympic Games to New York City in 2012, which failed when London won. Ross is chairman of Equinox Holdings, and chairperson emeritus of the Real Estate Board of New York (REBNY), the city's leading real estate trade association. As a member of the board of trustees of the Solomon R. Guggenheim Foundation, Ross was involved in the planning of a major renovation of the Frank Lloyd Wright iconic building and other new museums. He is a trustee of New York Presbyterian Hospital, the Urban Land Institute, the NY Chapter of Juvenile Diabetes Research Foundation International, the Levin Institute and is a director of the Jackie Robinson Foundation and the World Resources Institute.

Ross serves on the Board for the Cornell Tech Campus, a $2B redevelopment of Roosevelt Island including the Joan & Irwin Jacobs Technion-Cornell Institute, a partnership between Cornell University and the Technion – Israel Institute of Technology that when completed will house several thousand post-graduate students, hundreds of faculty, and a high-tech business incubator.

Ross invested in a partnership named RERI that was donated to the University of Michigan in 2003.  RERI obtained its own appraisal for the donation in the amount of $32.935 million.  The university sold the Ross-donated remainder interest in December, 2005 for $1.94 million, below the $6.5 million appraised value. The IRS denied the entire $33 million tax deduction and imposed a multi-million dollar penalty in July, 2017.  Ross's longtime accountant Alan Katz and business associate, Harold Levine were instrumental in the partnership.  They are currently under criminal investigation for the tax plan.

Politics 
Ross was a major supporter and contributor to the 2012 presidential campaign of Mitt Romney.

In August 2019, it was reported that Ross would host a major fundraiser for Donald Trump's 2020 presidential campaign at his Hamptons home on August 9. 

In response to calls for boycotts of companies owned by Ross, a spokesperson for Equinox and SoulCycle told CNN, "Neither Equinox nor SoulCycle have anything to do with the event later this week and do not support it. As is consistent with our policies, no company profits are used to fund politicians."

Ross is a major investor in Ladder Capital, a "shadow bank". Around the time Trump became president, Ross attempted a takeover of Ladder Bank. He was unsuccessful, but did purchase an $80 million stake. According to the former President's 2019 financial disclosure, Ladder Capital lent $275 million to Donald Trump in mortgages and between $110 million and $150 million is still owed, of which $50 million is from the 2012 mortgage on Trump Tower.

In 2021, his super PAC, Common Sense NYC spent $550,000 to oppose eight progressive Democrats in New York City's 2021 City Council election. They succeeded in helping defeat six of the eight Democrats.

Honors and awards
Ross has received numerous honors for his business, civic, and philanthropic activities. He was named the third Most Powerful Person in New York Real Estate by the New York Observer, Multi-Family Property Executive of the Year by Commercial Property News, and Housing Person of the Year by the National Housing Conference.

Personal life
Ross has two children from his first marriage. In April 2021, it was made public that he was divorcing his second wife, Kara (née Gaffney) Ross, after 18 years of marriage. He has two stepchildren with Gaffney. Ross resides in Southampton, New York.

Besides his home in the Deutsche Bank Center in Manhattan, Ross also owns an 11,000 square foot oceanfront mansion in Palm Beach named "The Reef".

References

External links
Stephen M. Ross – Chairman Of The Board
 Anatomy of a deal: Inside Related/Oxford's unusual financing of Hudson Yards

1940 births
Living people
20th-century American businesspeople
21st-century American businesspeople
American billionaires
American chairpersons of corporations
American company founders
American marketing businesspeople
American political fundraisers
American real estate businesspeople
American sports businesspeople
Bear Stearns people
Businesspeople from New York City
Giving Pledgers
21st-century philanthropists
Jewish American philanthropists
Jewish American sportspeople
Miami Beach Senior High School alumni
Miami Dolphins owners
Michigan lawyers
Michigan Republicans
New York (state) Republicans
New York University School of Law alumni
Patrons of schools
Businesspeople from Detroit
People from Manhattan
Philanthropists from New York (state)
Real estate company founders
Ross School of Business alumni
Solomon R. Guggenheim Foundation
University of Florida alumni
Wayne State University Law School alumni
Mumford High School alumni
People from Southampton (town), New York
University of Michigan alumni